Atle Sommerfeldt (born 22 November 1951) is a Norwegian prelate, who resigned from being the Bishop of Borg late in 2021. Prior to becoming a bishop, he was Secretary General of the Norwegian Church Aid from 1994 to 2012.

Biography
Sommerfeldt was appointed Bishop of Borg on 28 October 2011 and was consecrated bishop on 29 January 2012 in Fredrikstad Cathedral. Sommerfeldt holds a Degree in theology gained in 1980. He has previously been a priest in the Diocese of Oslo (1982-1984), General Secretary of the Botswana Christian Council (1989-1993) and General Secretary of the Council on Ecumenical and International Relations of the Church of Norway (1993–94).

References

1951 births
Living people
Bishops of Borg
21st-century Lutheran bishops